The 1996 Kazakhstan Top Division was the fifth season of the Top Division, now called the Kazakhstan Premier League, the highest football league competition in Kazakhstan.

Teams
There were no teams relegated at the end of the 1995 season, however Gornyak withdrew from the league at the start of the season, whilst Kaisar-Munai, Kokshe and Metallist were promoted to the Top Division. Prior to the start of the season Tsesna Akmola was renamed Tselinnik Akmola, Ansat became Irtysh Pavlodar and Aktyubinets became Aktobemunai.

Team overview

League table

Results

Statistics

Top scorers

See also
Kazakhstan national football team 1996

References

External links
 Lyakhov.kz 1996 Season

Kazakhstan Premier League seasons
1
Kazakh
Kazakh